Juno Doran is a visual and sound artist based in North Dorset, United Kingdom.

Life and work
Juno Doran is a visual and sound artist based in the UK. She was born in 1966 in Abrantes, Portugal, and moved to London, United Kingdom, in 1992.

Selected solo exhibitions
 2014 Descent, drawing installation, Cambridge Art Salon, Cambridge
2003 'forgetting Godot', Catto Contemporary, London
2000 'The Beautiful People', ContraCapa, Abrantes, Portugal
1999 Cornerhouse, Manchester
1998 The Beautiful People, Pannett Art Gallery, Whitby
1997 Portraits in colour, Tea for Two, Abrantes, Portugal
1997 Home Stills, Dazed and Confused Magazine, London
1994 Portuguese in London, Museum of London
1994 Portuguese in London, South Bank Centre, London

Selected group exhibitions
2015 Colectiva, Quartel Municipal Gallery, Abrantes, Portugal
 2013 Jerwood Encounters: Family Politics, Photocopy Club, Jerwood Space, London
 2013 Sydenham Arts Festival, London
 2010 2010 Fine Art, 2010 FIFA World Cup™, South Africa
 2008 The heart is a lonely hunter, 31Grand Gallery, New York
 2007 Sugar and Spice, Vegas Gallery, London
 2007 Art Auction 2007, Medical foundation for the care of victims of torture, The Building Centre, London
 2007 Decadence, Decay and Demimonde, Home House, London
 2007 Astley Biennial Open Exhibition, Astley Hall, Chorley
 2007 I’ll be your mirror, Gallery Primo Alonso, Hackney, London
2007 Decadence, Decay and Demimonde, Home House, London
2007 Sugar & Spice, Vegas Gallery, London
2007 I'll Be Your Mirror, Gallery Primo Alonso, London
2006 Britishness, art network project by Another Product, Cornerhouse, Manchester
2005 Forever Beautiful, Clapham Art Gallery, London
2003 BP Portrait Award Exhibition, National Portrait Gallery, London
2003 Superheroes, Ruby Green Contemporary Art Center, Nashville, USA, October/November, curated by Joseph Whitt
2002 I'll be your mirror, Warsaw Projects, Open Arts Studios, Manchester
2002 Pop Life', 31Grand, Brooklyn, New York
2002 Perverse Pop, Catto Contemporary, London
2000 BP Portrait Award Exhibition, National Portrait Gallery, London
2000 Big Issue Book of Home exhibition, London
1998 Form and Fantasy: Art & the Fairground, Mid Pennine Art Gallery, Burnley
1994 Herstory - part of Festival of Women Photographers, Alternative Art Gallery, London

See also
 Neomodern
 Photorealism

External links
 Juno Doran official website

1966 births
British contemporary artists
British multimedia artists
Living people
British women artists
Portuguese artists
Portuguese women artists
People from Abrantes
Portuguese emigrants to the United Kingdom